is a Noh play in the first category by Zeami Motokiyo, about the Japanese god of poetry repelling the Chinese poet Bai Juyi (or Po Chü-i) from Japan 500 years earlier, in defiance of the (perceived) challenge from China to the autonomy of Japanese poetry.

Historical background
While Bai did not in fact ever travel to Japan, his influence there was enormous in the 9th century: the work of the leading Japanese poet, Sugawara no Michizane, was so under Bai's spell as to be described by Arthur Waley as "an unparalleled example of literary prostration".

A similar challenge to indigenous arts from the prestige of Chinese culture had emerged in the 14th century, something that fuelled the strong element of cultural resistance to be found in Zeami's play.

Plot
The poet Bai is sent by the emperor of China to test the Japanese, and meets two fishermen on his arrival. The elder of the fishermen explains to him the nature of Japanese poetry, Yamato Uta, suggesting that it is something shared both by men and by the birds, insects, and frogs of the land.  

Gradually the fisherman is revealed to be Sumiyoshi no Kami, the Japanese god of poetry himself. He launches into a series of dances that summon a divine wind, blowing a defeated Bai back to China.

Borrowings and reception
The opening Jo section sees the waki (Haku Rakuten) and waki-tsure sing of the lands of the rising sun and of the setting sun, seemingly a reference to Shōtoku Taishi's famous letter sent by Empress Suiko to Emperor Yang of Sui. In the ensuing Ha section, the shite (an old fisherman) acknowledges the status of Chinese poetic shi and fu, together with that of the Buddhist scriptures from India, but suggests that rather than servile imitation the Japanese poetic tradition "blends", develops, and transcends its inheritance; his proposition, as above, that the birds and the beasts share in the creation of Japanese poetry and song, draws on Ki no Tsurayuki's preface to the Kokinshū.

In turn, the noh play has inspired works including folding screens by Ogata Kōrin, and woodblock prints by Suzuki Harunobu and Kōgyo Tsukioka.

See also

Kanshi (poetry)

Related images

References

External links 
 Haku Rakuten

Japanese art
Noh plays